Tha Li is a district (amphoe) in the northwestern part of Loei province, northeastern Thailand.

Geography
Neighboring districts are (from the northeast clockwise): Chiang Khan, Mueang Loei and Phu Ruea of Loei Province. To the northwest is Xaignabouli province of Laos.

The northwestern part of the district reaches the southern end of the Luang Prabang Range mountain area of the Thai highlands.

Administration
The district is divided into six sub-districts (tambons), which are further subdivided into 41 villages (mubans). Tha Li is a township (thesaban tambon) which covers parts of tambon Tha Li. There are a further five tambon administrative organizations (TAO).

References

External links
amphoe.com

Tha Li